Mary Bonnin is a former Master Chief in the United States Navy. She retired from her position in 1996. She had been with the United States Navy for 20 years, graduating at the top of her class in both air and gas surface-supplied diving. She then became the first woman Master Diver, and later she would be one of the first women to enter the Women Divers Hall of Fame.

Military career
Mary Bonnin enlisted in the United States Navy in 1976. She graduated top of her class, and later became the first enlisted female diver certified in both air and gas diving. During her tour she trained over one-thousand divers, and worked in various posts around the ship. She also served as the leading diver safety authority. Mary Bonnin eventually retired from the Navy in 1996.

Achievements
Over the course of her military years she has won many awards and honors. She was added into the Women Divers Hall of Fame (WDHOF) in 2000. The WDHOF was designed originally to give tribute to the most notable divers, however it quickly developed into a tribute of women that helped the exploration of the sea. Many notable women have been inducted into the WDHOF such as: Dr. Eugenie Clark, U.S. Chief Scientist Kathy Sullivan, and many others.

References

Living people
Year of birth missing (living people)
American underwater divers
Place of birth missing (living people)
United States Navy sailors
Female United States Navy personnel